Piera Aulagnier (née Spairani; November 19, 1923 – March 31, 1990), was a French psychiatrist and psychoanalyst. Her contributions to psychoanalysis include the concepts of interpretative violence, pictogram and originary process.

Life and contributions
Aulagnier was born in Milan in 1923, and trained in medicine at Rome, before finishing psychiatric training in Paris after 1950. She undertook a training analysis with Jacques Lacan from 1955 to 1961, and followed him in 1964 into the newly formed École freudienne de Paris, where she remained for some time a close confidant. In 1969, however, Aulagnier, Jean-Paul Valabrega and François Perrier split from the EFP over the bitter question of the passe as a qualification for analyst status, and created the Organisation psychanalytique de langue française. The organization played a prominent role in post-Lacanian psychoanalysis.

Aulagnier, a founding member of the journal Tropique, is considered one of the most influential French psychoanalysts of her generation, together with Jean Laplanche, Jean-Bertrand Pontalis and André Green.  Aulagnier created an original, if difficult theory of child psychosis, revolving around the experiences of infant-mother relationships in early childhood, and drawing on and developing the theories of both Winnicott and Lacan.  In particular she proposed the concept of the pictogram as an initial link between the body zones and the first mental representations; and continued to work for a theoretical recuperation of the importance of body and feelings as non-verbal presences within early thought.

She also warned against the danger of interpretations being experienced as invasive by an analysand, (particularly when their own omnipotence has been projected onto the analyst).

Aulagnier died in 1990 in Paris. She was married to Cornelius Castoriadis from 1968 until 1984.

See also

Selected writings
 Piera Aulagnier. The Violence of Interpretation (1975). The New Library of Psychoanalysis. Brunner-Routledge, 2001.

Notes

References
 Sophie de Mijolla-Mellor (2005). "Aulagnier-Spairani, Piera." In: A. de Mijolla (Ed.), International dictionary of psychoanalysis, vol. 1 (pp. 129–30). Farmington Hills, MI: Thomson Gale.

1923 births
1990 deaths
French psychiatrists
French psychoanalysts
Physicians from Milan
Analysands of Jacques Lacan
20th-century French writers
20th-century French women writers
20th-century French physicians
French women psychiatrists
20th-century women physicians
Italian emigrants to France